The following is the discography for American garage punk musician Jay Reatard and his associated acts.

As Jay Reatard

Albums

Blood Visions LP/CD (2006; In the Red)
Watch Me Fall LP/CD (2009; Matador)

EPs

Night of Broken Glass (2007; In the Red)
In the Dark (2007; Squoodge)
Blood Demo" (2008; Stained Circles)
Tour Split (2009; Split with Thee Oh Sees; Shattered)

Singles

Hammer I Miss You (2006; Goner)
Split with the Boston Chinks (2007; P. Trash)
I Know a Place (2007; Goner)
See/Saw (2008; Matador)
Painted Shut (2008; Matador)
Always Wanting More (2008; Matador)
Fluorescent Grey (2008; Matador)
Trapped Here (2008; Matador)
No Time (2008; Matador)
Gamma Ray (2008; Split with Beck; XL Recordings)
Hang Them All (2009; Split with Sonic Youth; Matador)
It Ain't Gonna Save Me (2009; Matador)
You Get No Love (2011; Shattered)

Compilations

Singles 06-07 LP/CD/DVD (2008; In the Red)
Matador Singles '08 LP/CD (2008; Matador)
Greatest Messes [Digital Release] (2009; Shattered)
Better Than Something LP (2012; Factory 25)

Compilation appearances

We Heart The Blowtops – Tribute [Track: Venom Victims Wine] (2006; Big Neck)
Stroke: Songs for Chris Knox - Various Artists [Track: Pull Down the Shades] (2009; Merge Records)In Utero, in Tribute, in Entirety – Various artists tribute to Nirvana [Track: "Frances Farmer Will Have Her Revenge on Seattle"] (2014; Robotic Empire)

Tribute albumsA French Tribute to Jay Reatard LP (2014; Teenage Hate Records)Blood Visions By Retard Records & Friends LP (2015; Retard Records)Russian Tribute To Jay Reatard LP (2015; Krapiva Records)JAY REATARD - A Canadian Tribute LP (2020; Retard Records)

With Lost Sounds

AlbumsMemphis Is Dead LP/CD (2001; Big Neck!)Black-Wave 2×LP/CD (2001; Empty)Rats Brains & Microchips LP/CD (2002; Empty)Lost Sounds LP/CD (2004; In the Red)
Blac Static (2011)

EPsSplit 7-inch with The Vanishing (2003; Cochon)Ice Age (2004; Holy Cobra Society)Future Touch 12-inch EP/CDEP (2004; In the Red)

SinglesPlastic Skin (2000; Solid Sex Lovie Doll)1 + 1 = Nothing (2001; Empty)Motorcycle Leather Boy (2007; Tic Tac Totally)

CompilationsOuttakes & Demos Vol. 1 CD-R (2001; Contaminated)Outtakes & Demos Vol. 1 LP (2002; Hate)Recent Transmissions: Demos & Outtakes Vol. 2 CD (2002; Contaminated)Demos II CD (2003; On/On Switch)Demos & Outtakes Vol. 2 3×7″ (2004; Rockin' Bones)
Lost Lost Sounds, Outtakes, and Demos (2012)

With The Reatards

AlbumsTeenage Hate LP/CD (1998; Goner)Grown Up, Fucked Up LP/CD (1999; Empty)Live LP (2004; Goner)Bedroom Disasters LP/CD (2004; Empty)Not Fucked Enough LP/CD/CD-R (2005; Empty/Shattered)

EPsGet Real Stupid (1997; Goner)Get Out Of Our Way (1999; Blahll!)Untitled (2002; SSLD)Monster Child (2004; Zaxxon)Plastic Surgery (2005; Shattered)Totally Shattered Euro Tour (2005; Split with Angry Angles and Tokyo Electron; Kenrock)

SinglesYour So Lewd (1999; Empty)I Lie Too (2006; Zaxxon Virile Action)

With The Final Solutions

AlbumsDisco Eraser LP/CD (2003; Misprint)Songs by Solutions LP/CD (2007; Goner)

EPsEat Shit (2002; Therapeutic)Return To The Motherland (2006; Frick & Frack)FS/DF (2007; Jethrow)

SinglesEye Don't Like You (2005; Shit Sandwich)My Love Is Disappointing (2005; Shattered)

With Nervous Patterns

AlbumsNervous Patterns CD-R/CD/LP (2003/2004; Contaminated/Cochon)

SinglesYou Can't Change (2005; Zaxxon)
Nervous Patterns/River City Tanlines split 7-inch (2012; Red Lounge)

With Angry Angles

AlbumsAngry Angles (2016; Goner)

EPsThings Are Moving (2005; Shattered)Totally Shattered Euro Tour (2005; Split with Angry Angles and Tokyo Electron; Kenrock)Apparent-Transparent (2006; Plastic Idol)

SinglesCrowds (2005; P. Trash)
Angry Angles / Digital Leather split 7-inch (2006; Split with Digital Leather; Shattered)

As Terror Visions

AlbumsWorld of Shit - Expanded edition LP (2011; [FDH Records)World of Shit LP/CD (2007; FDH Records)

EPsEndless Tunnel (Shattered)

SinglesBlood in America (Disordered)

With Bad Times

AlbumsBad Times LP (2001; Goner/Therapeutic)Bad Times (Re-Release) CD (2002; Sympathy For The Record Industry)

With Destruction Unit

AlbumsSelf-Destruction of a Man LP/CD (2004; Empty)Death to the Old Flesh LP/CD'' (2006; Empty)

References

External links
Official Jay Reatard website

Discographies of American artists
Punk rock discographies